Velology is the study and collection of vehicle tax discs, particularly of those issued in the United Kingdom from 1 January 1921 to 30 September 2014.

A tax disc was a circular certificate that vehicle owners had to place on the front windscreen of road vehicles, as visual proof that vehicle tax has been paid. Similar systems exist in some other countries, such as in Ireland, but the use of automatic number plate recognition has rendered tax discs redundant in the United Kingdom.

The word is a combination of the acronym "VEL", for vehicle excise licence, and -ology. Collectors are known as velologists.

Origins
The collection of tax discs was first popularised by Elite Registrations, vehicle number plate dealers and has since developed a niche following.  In response to the interest, a collector's magazine, The Velologist, is published monthly. The study of expired and historical tax discs is also a central component of an affiliated industry: the production of replica age-appropriate tax discs for collectors of vintage and classic cars; these can be legally displayed alongside the required modern disc or exemption certificate.

Collectors value specimens which are intact, unfaded and rare. Those of particular interest include emergency discs (serial number prefaced with an E, issued when supplies of normal discs were interrupted) and Welsh language discs. Another variation was the "farmers' disc", identified by an "F", which was displayed on agricultural vehicles.

History of tax discs

The vehicle excise duty was first introduced in the United Kingdom in 1889, but the requirement to display a paper tax disc on the vehicle came into force on 1 January 1921. Initially, tax discs were issued for one year (annual) to 31 December, or for three months (quarterly) to 24 March, 30 June, 30 September or 31 December.

Early discs were made from plain paper, without perforations; the selvedge was cut or folded to create the main circular shape. Colour printing was introduced in 1923. Advertising on the reverse of the disc was allowed from 1924, with companies such as Shell Oil placing advertisements. This was abolished in 1926, after which the reverse showed text relating to the refund available for unexpired licences. Perforations were used from 1938, enabling a better fit within the standard disc holders; however, the perforations were missing from 1942 to 1952, perhaps as a result of equipment damage during the war.  In 1961 major changes occurred, with a redesign of the printed pattern – for better security – and a new system of monthly issues, rather than the standard December expiry of the past.  From then on, the expiry month was displayed. From 2001, watermarking and embossing were added to prevent fraud.

The last tax discs in the United Kingdom expired on 30 September 2015, but the requirement to display them ended on 1 October 2014. In the last month before the abolition of tax discs came into force, the DVLA issued some new tax discs on printer paper, to save costs.

Design
The design of British licence disc has varied over the decades since its introduction on 1 January 1921. Among the factors for its evolution are the changing legislation and the increase in security features to mitigate counterfeiting. The latest series (2003) incorporated a bar code to verify its authenticity with the vehicle it was registered to, and to increase efficiency of renewal applications as renewal via the internet was introduced. A design variant was adopted in Wales in the early 1970s with the month expressed as a number instead of by name and other details printed additionally in Welsh. This was introduced when the government decided that all official documentation in Wales would be bilingual, but it was judged that the print size would be too small for the name of month to be abbreviated and displayed in two languages. Later, this design with the month expressed as a number was adopted throughout the UK.

1921 series
The 1921 series was the first design of the licence disc which were required to be displayed in every British vehicle since 1 January 1921. They were issued with two possible lengths of duration: one year (annual) or three months (sometimes referred to as a quarterly licence). Quarterly licences were issued on coloured paper to differentiate between the two periods of duty they were issued for.

1923 series

1932 series

1938 series
The 1938 series of Annual licence discs were a minor design revision to the 1932 series, and were issued from 1 January 1938 to July 1950. The background pattern text was revised to read "Mechanically propelled vehicle licence", instead of "Road Fund Licence".

1951 series
The 1951 series were first issued on 1 January 1951 as a revision to the previous series. The emblems of Regions of the United Kingdom were replaced with the expiry year and the arrangement of the expiry date was modified to increase legibility. Licence discs issued for 1954 to 1956 removed the requirement for specifying the colour of the vehicle. A diagonal colour band overprint was used for licences for 1951 and 1952, and a vertical band for the remainder of the series.

1957 series
The 1957 series were first issued on 1 January 1957 and continued until the replacement of quarter-year licences with four-month licences on 1 October 1960.

1961 series

2003 series

Notes

References
 Hill, Tony; (2006) Trade and Collect Tax Discs UK: Collecticus  excerpts available online
 Tennant, Chris, & Hitchings, Ed; (2012) Tax Discs of the British Isles UK: Revenue Society. Catalogues by John Barefoot.

External links
 The Velologist
 History of the Tax Disc

Hobbies
Collecting